Edwin Penhorwood (born 1939) is an American composer who is an assistant professor at the Jacobs School of Music at Indiana University.

Biography
Penhorwood is a native of Toledo, Ohio, and studied music at the University of Iowa. He has taught at the International School of Zurich, Switzerland, at the Church Music Conservatory in Berlin, the University of Missouri, and Indiana University, and has accompanied singers and instrumentalists in North America and in Europe for many years. Penhorwood joined the faculty of Indiana University in 1993. He is the musical director of the Graduate Opera Workshop and has taught Accompanying.

Penhorwood is the composer of many choral and vocal compositions. Penhorwood's songs have been broadcast by NPR, the Paris and Berlin radio networks and have been featured at Glimmerglass Opera, The Chautauqua Opera, the National NATS Convention, and Marilyn Horne's 70th Birthday Celebration. In 1999, the Indianapolis Symphonic Chorus, through the Lilly Foundation, presented Penhorwood with a commission for a choral work, The Christmas Story. Penhorwood's compositions have been published by Carl Fischer, Abingdon, Hinshaw Music, and T.I.S. Publications. In 2000, T.I.S., Inc. published his songs and song cycles.

ECS Publishing published Penhorwood's comic opera Too Many Sopranos, commissioned by the Cedar Rapids Opera Theatre and premiered in June 2000. The opera, now in its fifth printing, has been presented at the NATS Convention and The National Opera Association National Convention in New York City. It has received over 80 productions, most recently at The Baltimore Opera and Light Opera Oklahoma. In March 2008, the Hunter College Opera staged a new production of the opera,  performed at the Danny Kaye Playhouse in New York City.

Penhorwood has edited two volumes of Vincenzo Righini's vocal works for Southern Music. Many of these compositions received their American premières at the 2nd International Congress of Voice Teachers held in Philadelphia.

He is married to soprano Costanza Cuccaro.

References

 First United Church Biography
 Boston Skirt! article on Too Many Sopranos
 PDF of University of Western Ontario's production of Too Many Sopranos

External links
 Indiana University biography
 Biography at T.I.S. Music Catalog
 Too Many Sopranos reviewed by T.I.S. Music Catalog
 Indiana University on Too Many Sopranos

20th-century classical composers
21st-century classical composers
American male classical composers
American classical composers
American opera composers
Male opera composers
University of Iowa alumni
1939 births
Living people
Musicians from Toledo, Ohio
Indiana University faculty
University of Missouri faculty
21st-century American composers
20th-century American composers
Classical musicians from Ohio
20th-century American male musicians
21st-century American male musicians